Louis James Balbach (May 23, 1896 – October 11, 1943) was an American diver who competed in the 1920 Summer Olympics.

He was born in San Jose, California, the son of Louis Augusta Balbach (1868-1908) and Nettie Viola (Bonar) Balbach (1873-1958), and grandson of pioneer John Balbach.  Louis died in Portland, Oregon.  Louis James Balbach was a well known swimmer and diver in the Portland area, doing well in many competitions.  He won an athletic scholarship to Columbia College (of Columbia University, New York), with whose team he went to the Olympics. He graduated in 1921 with a Bachelor of Arts.

In 1920 he won the bronze medal in the 3 m springboard competition. In the 10 metre platform event he finished sixth.

References

External links
Louis Balbach's profile at Sports Reference.com

1896 births
1943 deaths
Divers at the 1920 Summer Olympics
Olympic bronze medalists for the United States in diving
American male divers
Medalists at the 1920 Summer Olympics